The term twice exceptional, often abbreviated as 2e,  entered educators' lexicons in the mid-1990s and refers to gifted students who have some form of learning or developmental disability. These students are considered exceptional both because of their giftedness (e.g., intellectual, creative, perceptual, motor etc.) and because they are disabled (e.g., specific learning disability, neurodevelopmental disability etc.) or neurodiverse.  Ronksley-Pavia (2015) presents a useful conceptual model of the co-occurrence of disability and giftedness.

A 2e child is one who, along with being considered gifted in comparison to same-age peers, is formally diagnosed with one or more disabilities. Although 2e can refer to any general disability, it is often used to refer to students with learning disabilities, although research is not limited to these areas, and a more holistic view of 2e can help move the field forward. The learning associated disabilities can include dyslexia, visual or auditory processing disorder, obsessive–compulsive disorder, sensory processing disorder, autism spectrum disorder, Tourette syndrome, attention deficit hyperactivity disorder. 2e can also be associated with a diagnosis of anxiety or depression or any other disability interfering with the student's ability to learn effectively in a traditional environment. For example, 19% of dyslexic students were found to be superiorly gifted in verbal reasoning. Often children with 2e have multiple co-morbid disabilities that present as a paradox to many parents and educators.

There is no clear-cut profile of twice-exceptional children because the nature and disabilities of twice exceptionality are so varied.  This variation among twice-exceptional children makes it difficult to determine just how many of them there might be.  Best estimates of prevalence range from 300,000 to 360,000 in the U.S. (on the order of 0.5% of the total number of children under 18).  Linda Silverman, Ph.D., the director of the Gifted Development Center has found that fully 1/6 of the gifted children tested at the GDC have a learning difference of some type. In Australia, in 2010 a conservative estimate of the prevalence of 2e children was around 40,000, or approximately 10% of gifted Australian children, although other estimates have placed this much higher at 30% of gifted Australian children as being 2e.

Misunderstood children

Brody and Mills [1997] argue that this population of students "could be considered the most misunderstood of all exceptionalities".  In each situation, the 2e student's strengths help to compensate for deficits; the deficits, on the other hand, make the child's strengths less apparent  although as yet there is no empirical research to confirm this theory. The interplay of exceptional strengths and weaknesses in a single individual results in inconsistency in performance. They might present any of the three profiles identified by educator and researcher Dr. Susan Baum:
 Bright but not trying hard enough
 Learning disabled but with no exceptional abilities
 Average
In the case of behavioral/socioemotional, rather than cognitive problems, both strengths and deficits can be intensified.
A 2e student's grades commonly alternate between high and low, sometimes within the same subject. The child might have advanced vocabulary and ideas but be unable to organize those ideas and express them on paper. They might be a skilled artist or builder but turn in assignments that are messy or illegible. They might complete assignments but lose them or forget to turn them in. To the parents and teachers observing this behavior, it may seem that the child just isn't trying. In fact, many 2e children work as hard if not harder than others, but with less to show for their efforts.
This struggle to accomplish tasks that appear easy for other students can leave 2e children frustrated, anxious, and depressed. It can rob them of their enthusiasm and energy for school and damage their self-esteem.

Identifying twice exceptionality
Twice exceptionality is not something that can solidly be diagnosed and therefore is not easily identified in students. Children identified as twice exceptional can exhibit a wide range of traits, many of them typical of gifted children. Like those who are gifted, 2e children often show greater asynchrony than average children (that is, a larger gap between their mental age and physical age). They are often intense and highly sensitive to their emotional and physical environments. The following chart summarizes characteristics commonly seen in this population.

 Twice exceptionality often does not show up until children are in school. In their early years, these children often seem very bright, with varied interests and advanced vocabularies (particularly with reference to same-age peers); and many times parents are unaware that they have a child with 2e. Teachers sometimes spot problems in school; sometimes parents are the first to notice their children's frustrations with school. During the early years it may be social difficulties. The 2e child may find it hard to make friends and fit in. Academic problems often appear later. As work demands increase, teachers may see a drop or inconsistencies in the student's performance, sometimes accompanied by an increase in problem behaviors. Some 2e students withdraw, showing reluctance to speak out or take other risks in class; while others play the class clown. Some are unable to stay focused, find it hard to sit still and work quietly, and have difficulty controlling anger or frustration.

If these difficulties persist, school personnel or parents may decide that evaluation is needed. Along with a physical examination, children may undergo psycho-educational testing to determine the cause of their struggles. The professionals who take part in the process should be knowledgeable about giftedness. Some characteristics of giftedness can look very much like those of a learning disability or disorder and, as a result, gifted children are sometimes incorrectly diagnosed with disorders. For instance, if a single IQ score is considered in the identification of giftedness, 2e individuals with learning disabilities are likely to be misidentified. Therefore, evaluation results should indicate the child's areas of strength and weakness and identify whether any disorders or learning disabilities are present. In addition, the results should include information on what the child needs in order to build on the strengths and compensate for the weaknesses that have been identified. Teaching to students' abilities rather than disabilities increases self-concept scores.

Support
Their strengths are the key to success for twice-exceptional children. They thrive on intellectual challenges in their areas of interest and ability. Many 2e children do best when given work that engages multiple senses and offers opportunities for hands-on learning. However, a requirement for success for these students is support, either given informally as needed or formalized, such as in an Individualized Education Program (IEP) or 504 plan in the USA.

Support can come in several forms. An essential form is encouragement; others include compensation strategies and accommodations in the child's areas of weakness. For example, 2e students may benefit from learning time-management skills and organizational techniques; and they may need to have extra time on tests and reduced homework. The student's strengths should not merely be viewed as means through which they can compensate for their areas of weakness. Proper support for a twice-exceptional student must include accommodations to allow them to develop and challenge their gifts as well. It is essential for these students to feel as though they are being noticed for their gifts more than just their weaknesses, otherwise the student may fall into negative behavioral patterns such as the ones aforementioned. In sum, appropriate interventions should address both the academic and social emotional needs of 2e learners.

School counselors have a unique role in supporting 2e students. Counselors are positioned to be a valuable resource for teachers, other school personnel, and community members who might not be familiar with twice-exceptionality. Foley-Nicpon and Assouline (2015) conducted a systematic review of the existing research regarding 2e students. The following are some of the authors’ proposed evidence-based considerations for school counselors and educators to use in their work with 2e students. In a qualitative study, Schultz (2012) used semi-structured interviews to explore the perceptions of parents, teachers, and counselors regarding 2e students’ participation in Advanced Placement or college-credit courses. She found that sometimes 2e students were not allowed to use their accommodations in these courses. Foley-Nicpon and Assouline (2015) propose that counselors can address these concerns by helping teachers to understand that accommodations and IEPs are legal mandates, not optional services.

In 2010, Foley-Nicpon, Doobay, and Assouline used the Behavior Assessment System for Children (BASC-2) to assess psychological functioning of fifty-four 2e students diagnosed with Autism Spectrum Disorder (ASD). Their results led them to conclude that a comprehensive evaluation is critical to obtaining a full understanding of 2e students’ academic, social, and emotional needs. Given these findings, Foley-Nicpon and Assouline (2015) suggest that school counselors review the records of each 2e student and consider both strengths and weaknesses in and out of the classroom in formulating treatment plans. Furthermore, they should help clients advocate for a comprehensive evaluation if one has not been obtained.

In 2012, Foley Nicpon, Assouline, and Stinson used the Wechsler Intelligence Scale for Children (WISC-IV) to examine the cognitive and academic profiles of fifty-two 2e students with ASD. Their results indicated that gifted individuals with ASD can have very high general, verbal, and/or nonverbal ability and simultaneous weaknesses in memory and the ability to process information. They also found that 2e individuals with ASD may generally have both high ability and significant differences in their ability and achievement profiles, including weaknesses in processing information quickly. Foley-Nicpon and Assouline (2015) used these findings to suggest that for the most effective practice, school counselors should adjust language and conceptualization based on 2e students’ abilities, level of insight, and developmental level. Furthermore, counselors and educators should allow sufficient time for individuals to process the information that is being presented. Change in therapy may happen more slowly with twice-exceptional clients. They also suggest that counselors recommend or offer accelerative opportunities within 2e students’ talent domains.

In their article that explores twice-exceptionality through multiple case studies, Assouline and Whiteman (2011) examine the two approaches that exist in understanding individuals with learning difficulties: an educational approach based on federal legislation (Individuals with Disabilities Education Act), and a psychological approach based on identifying learning or behavioral disorders as determined through diagnostic criteria. Foley-Nicpon and Assouline (2015) suggest that counselors need to understand how the individual's diagnosis was determined and (in a K–12 setting) become aware of the rights afforded to that individual via a 504 plan for accommodation or an IEP. Counselors should set a goal to promote the individual's development of self-advocacy and problem-solving skills, particularly as he or she transitions out of formal education.

Education
The twice-exceptional education movement started in the early 1970s with "gifted-handicapped" education, a term essentially referring to the same population. The 2e education approach is backed by 35 years of research and best practices tailored to the unique needs of 2e students. It is a marriage between special education and gifted education—a strengths-based, differentiated approach that provides special educational supports. Many argue that talent development is the most critical aspect of their education.

When teaching 2e students there are methods an educator should avoid. Twice exceptionality students do not respond well to lectures, and tend to gravitate more toward "big picture" learning. These students have a hard time following unnecessarily strict rules, and should not be expected to conform to them. Instead, being flexible with them, and focusing more on holistic, big-picture learning is recommended.

Still, finding schools that can meet the needs of twice exceptional children can be a challenge for many parents. Public and private schools with programs that combine the appropriate levels of challenge and support for these learners are in the minority. For this reason, a number of parents choose alternative educational options for their 2e children, including homeschooling and virtual schools.

Only a handful of schools in United States offer a curriculum specifically tailored to 2e children. Some public schools offer part-time programs for twice exceptional students, where they can progress in subjects like math at their own pace, and meet other students like themselves.

See also
 Exceptional education
 Gifted and talented education
 Learning disability
 Neurodiversity

References

Further reading
 Bellis, T. J. (2002). When the Brain Can't Hear: Unraveling the Mystery of Auditory Processing Disorder. New York: Atria.
 Bireley, M. (1995). Crossover Children: A Sourcebook for Helping Children Who Are Gifted and Learning Disabled. Reston, VA: Council for Exceptional Children.
 Curtis, S. E. (2008). Understanding Your Child's Puzzling Behavior: A Guide for Parents of Children with Behavioral, Social, and Learning Challenges. Bainbridge Island, WA: Lifespan Press.
 Dare, L., & Nowicki, E.A. (2015). Twice-exceptionality: Parents’ perspectives on 2e identification. Roeper Review. 37(4), 208–218. doi: 10.1080/02783193.2015.1077911
 Dendy, C. A. Z. (2000). Teaching Teens with ADD and AD/HD: A Quick Reference Guide for Teachers and Parents. Bethesda, MD: Woodbine House.
 Eide, B. & F. (2006). The Mislabeled Child. New York: Hyperion.
 Johnsen, S. K. & Kendrick, J. (2005). Teaching Gifted Students with Disabilities. Waco: Prufrock Press.
 Kaufman, R.K (2014).  Autism Breakthrough . The Son Rise Program Developmental Model,  New York: [www.stmartins.com St. Martin's Press] 
 Levine, M. (2002). The Myth of Laziness. New York: Simon & Schuster.
 Lovecky, Deirdre (2004). Different Minds: Gifted Children With AD/HD, Asperger Syndrome, and other Learning Deficits. London: Jessica Kingsley Publishers.
 Miller, L. J. (2006). Sensational Kids: Hope and Help for Children with Sensory Processing Disorder. New York: G.P. Putnam's Sons.
 Probst, B. (2008). When the Labels Don't Fit: A New Approach to Raising a Challenging Child. New York: Three Rivers Press.
 Rivero, L. (2002). Creative Home Schooling: A Resource Guide for Smart Families. Scottsdale: Great Potential Press.
 Schultz, S. M. (2009). Twice-exceptional Students Participating in Advanced Placement and other College Classes while Still in High School. USA: VDM
 Silverman, L. (2002). Upside-Down Brilliance: The Visual-Spatial Learner. Denver: DeLeon Publishing, Inc.
 Vail, Priscilla (1989). Smart Kids with School Problems: Things to Know and Ways to Help. New York: Plume.
 Weinfeld, R., Jeweler, S., Barnes-Robinson, L., Shevitz, B. (2006). Smart Kids with Learning Difficulties: Overcoming Obstacles and Realizing Potential. Waco: Prufrock Press.

External links
2eNews.com
Association for the Education of Gifted Underachieving Students
Top Schools For 2E Kids in The U.S.
 Hoagies' Gifted Education Page
 Uniquely Gifted
 Gifted Homeschoolers Forum
 The Twice-Exceptional Dilemma
 The Lang School
 The Quad Preparatory School
 TECA 2e – Twice Exceptional Children's Advocacy
Bridges 2e Center for Research & Professional Development

Giftedness
Educational psychology
Special education
Childhood
Parenting